The Château de Réghat is a château in Maisons-Alfort, Val-de-Marne, Île-de-France, France.

History
The château was built in the second half of the 18th century and in the 19th century.

Architectural significance
It has been listed as a monument historique since 1979.

References

Châteaux in Val-de-Marne
Monuments historiques of Île-de-France